Põlula is a village in Vinni Parish, Lääne-Viru County, in northeastern Estonia.

Estonian general August Traksmaa was born in Põlula.

References

 

Villages in Lääne-Viru County
Kreis Wierland